Andrzej Tomasz Iskrzycki (born November 20, 1951) is a former Polish ice hockey player. He played for the Poland men's national ice hockey team at the 1976 Winter Olympics in Innsbruck.

References

1951 births
Living people
Ice hockey players at the 1976 Winter Olympics
Olympic ice hockey players of Poland
People from Nowy Targ
Sportspeople from Lesser Poland Voivodeship
Polish ice hockey defencemen
Podhale Nowy Targ players